Gaite Sara Kim Jansen (born 25 December 1991) is a Dutch actress born in Rotterdam, the Netherlands.

Life and career
Jansen received her professional training at the Maastricht Academy of Dramatic Arts.

At age 12, she was awarded the Best Actress Award at the 48 Hour Film Project in Amsterdam for her role in Luwte. Her performance as a troubled deaf teenager in the acclaimed arthouse film 170 Hz (2011) earned her nominations for Best Actress at the Seattle Film Festival and the Netherlands Film Festival. The film Supernova, in which she plays the lead role, was selected for the Generations competition at Berlinale film festival 2014.

In 2014, Jansen made her stage debut at the prestigious Amsterdam Theatre Group, as Ophelia in Hamlet vs. Hamlet, directed by Guy Cassiers and played in Medea later that year.

In 2015, Jansen appeared as the lead role in the film Greenland. She played a suicidal girl in In Therapie, the Dutch version of BeTipul in 2010. She was nominated "best actress" at the Gouden Kalf awards in 2012 for her role in 170 Hz, where she played a deaf girl and conversed mostly in Dutch Sign Language.

Jansen also plays the role of Duchess Tatiana Petrovna in the third season of the BBC gangster drama Peaky Blinders. 
In 2017 she appeared as Hana Raznikova in Line of Duty. She plays Phoenix in the Cinemax TV series Jett.

Filmography

Film

Television

References

External links

 
 

1991 births
Living people
Dutch child actresses
Actors from Rotterdam